Glycine soja, known as wild soybean, is an annual plant in the legume family. It may be treated as a separate species, the closest living relative of the cultivated soybean, Glycine max, an important crop, or as a subspecies of the cultivated soybean, Glycine max subsp. soja.

The plant is native to eastern China, Japan, Korea and far-eastern Russia.

References

External links

Plants for a Future
Sorting Glycine names 

soja
Flora of China
Flora of Japan
Flora of Korea
Flora of the Russian Far East
Flora of the Ryukyu Islands